Santa Maria dei Servi, or simply known as the Chiesa dei Servi, or more fully as the Church of the Nativity of the Servants of the Blessed Virgin Mary, is a 14th-century, Roman Catholic church that faces the Via Roma (once Sant’Egidio) in Padua, region of the Veneto, Italy. This is the parish church in the vicariate of the Cathedral Basilica of Santa Maria Assunta governed by the Servite Order (order of the Servants of Mary). The church contains outstanding works of art including a wooden crucifix by Donatello.

History

Construction of the church between 1372 and 1390 was patronized by Fina Buzzaccarini, wife of the Prince of Padua, Francesco Da Carrara the Elder. The building was built on the site of the razed palace of Nicholas Carrara, who in 1327 betrayed Francesco by conspiring with Cangrande I della Scala. In 1378, after his death, he left to his sister Anna Fina, abbess of the monastery of St Benedict, the task of completing the construction of the church. In 1393 Francesco Novello, son of Fina and lord of Padua gave the church to the Servites. The church in the sixteenth century was the subject of major refurbishments mainly by Bartolomeo from Campolongo who built in 1511 the porch toward the street; for the refurbishment, he utilized ten octagonal columns of red marble from the demolition of the 14th-century Chapel of the Saint in the Basilica of St. Anthony of Padua. The Servi church was part of a convent of the Servants of Mary, the Oratory of St. Omobono and that of the guild of Santa Maria del Parto.

In 1807 the Servite Fathers were expelled and the church was confiscated and forfeited in state assets.  It was established as a parish church, run by secular clergy. In the 1920s the interior of the church was restored to the austere 14th-century appearance. The building was reconsecrated in 1963 .

In June 2014, the Bishop of Padua accepted the request of the Superior of the Order of Servants of Mary to be able to return to their historic church after 207 years of regency by the secular clergy. The delivery charge is on 6 September of the same year. The churches of San Canciano and San Luca are now subsidiaries to this church. For a period the churches of San Zilio and Santa Giuliana were also subsidiaries, until they were closed.

The following are entombed inside the church: the jurist Paul Castro and his son Angelo, consistorial lawyer, his father served Girolamo Quaini professor of Scripture at the Studio, Count Emilio Raymond Strong Campolongo and doctors, and Jerome Olzignani Ottonello Pasino. The convent was home to Fra Paolo Sarpi.

External
The Gothic-style building is oriented north - south, parallel to the street. The façade supported by pilasters and arches, juts out on a short square; it opens an elegant portal Gothic-Lombard style in Vicenza stone with an oculus window atop. The arcade covers a 1510 porch commissioned by Bartolomeo Campolongo. The 10 octagonal columns were reutilized from a 14th-century chapel in the nearby basilica church of St Antony. On the porch there is a large Gothic portal (last decades of the 14th century), made from blocks of white and red marble. The 15th-century wooden doors are carved in the Lombard Romanesque style. Along the wall between pilasters and arches opening single-light trefoil. The apse is hidden by the surrounding buildings.

The 14th century bell tower rises above the chapel on the right side, supported on pilasters and arches. The belfry is illuminated by Gothic windows. During the 2004 restoration, the bell mechanism was electrified.

Interior

Altare dell'Addolorata  
The rococo altar decoration was designed by the sculptor Rinaldino di Francia. The flanking marble statues (1710) of Saints Philip and Juliana were sculpted by Giovanni Bonazza. The central statue of the virgin is by an unknown 15th-century sculptor.

Works of Matteo Ghidoni

The Miraculous Crucifix by Donatello 
 Left absidial chapel

See also
Diocese of Padua

Notes 

Roman Catholic churches in Padua
14th-century Roman Catholic church buildings in Italy
Churches completed in 1390